All This Time may refer to:

 All This Time (Heartless Bastards album), 2006
 All This Time (Sting album), a 2001 live album and concert film by Sting
 "All This Time" (Drax Project song), 2019
 "All This Time" (Michelle McManus song), 2003
 "All This Time" (Britt Nicole song), 2012
 "All This Time" (Sting song), 1991
 "All This Time" (Tiffany song), 1988
 "All This Time (Pick-Me-Up Song)", a song by Maria Mena from Cause and Effect
 All This Time, a 1996 multimedia CD-ROM featuring the music of Sting

See also 
 After All This Time (disambiguation)